Estonia has participated in the biennial classical music competition Eurovision Young Musicians six times since its debut in 1994, most recently taking part in 2018. The country's best result is a third-place finish in 1996.

Participation overview

See also
Estonia in the Eurovision Song Contest

References

External links 
 Eurovision Young Musicians

Countries in the Eurovision Young Musicians